McKim Marriott is an American anthropologist. Marriott received a PhD from the University of Chicago in 1955.

Marriott has studied villagers and urbanites of Asia and professionals of Asia, including Japan. He criticized Western categories which often present obstacles to understanding peoples, and he elaborated alternative models for studying differing cultural realities.

Selected publications
1998	The female family core explored ethnosociologically. Contributions to Indian Sociology. 32: 279-304	
1997	A Description of SAMSARA, A Realization of Rural Hindu Life. Chicago: McKim Marriott.	
1992	Alternative social sciences. In J. MacAloon, ed., General Education in the Social Sciences. Chicago: University of Chicago Press, pp. 262–278.	
1991	On ‘Constructing an Indian ethnosociology’ Contributions to Indian Sociology. 25:295-308.	
1990	(Editor) India through Hindu Categories. New Delhi/Newbury Park/London: Sage Publications.

Further reading
Review: India as a Philosophical Problem: Mckim Marriott and the Comparative Enterprise: India through Hindu Categories by McKim Marriott Review by: Edwin Gerow Journal of the American Oriental Society Vol. 120, No. 3 (Jul. - Sep., 2000), pp. 410–429

References

External links
Marriott at Worldcat

Living people
University of Chicago alumni
American anthropologists
Year of birth missing (living people)